Ghazni District, is a district of Ghazni province, Afghanistan situated in the northeast part of the province. Capital of the district is Ghazni, which is also capital of Ghazni Province.

Demographics & Population
Like in the rest of Afghanistan, no exact population numbers are available. The Afghan Ministry of Rural Rehabilitation & Development (MRRD) along with UNHCR and Central Statistics Office (CSO) of Afghanistan estimates the population of the district to be around 154,618. According to AIMS and UNHCR, Hazaras make up 50% of the population, followed by Tajiks and Pashtuns, 50%.

Security and Politics
It was reported that Afghan and ISAF forces combined and killed several militants and captured an al-Qaeda IED facilitator and another incident on the southern side of Ghazni City.

See also

 Districts of Afghanistan

References

Districts of Ghazni Province